

Season events
On 16 August, Reading signed Fara Williams from Arsenal Women to a two-year contract.

On 3 January, Reading signed Natasha Harding from Liverpool to a long-term contract.

Squad

Transfers

In

Out

Released

Pre-season

Competitions

Women's Super League

Results summary

Results by matchday

Results

League table

FA Cup

FA WSL Cup

Group stage

Knockout stage

Squad statistics

Appearances 

|-
|colspan="14"|Players away from the club on loan:
|-
|colspan="14"|Players who appeared for Reading but left during the season:

|}

Goal scorers

Clean sheets

Disciplinary record

References

Reading F.C. Women